Scoparia huachucalis is a moth in the family Crambidae. It was described by Eugene G. Munroe in 1972. It is found in North America, where it has been recorded from Arizona.

References

Moths described in 1972
Scorparia